Hope is a town in Knox County, Maine, United States. The population was 1,698 at the 2020 census.

Geography

Principle bodies of water include: Part of Megunticook Lake, Alford Lake (595), Hobbs Pond (266 acres),  Lermond Pond (173 acres), Fish Pond (112 acres), Mansfield Pond (41 acres) and Lily Pond (29 acres).

The town is crossed by Maine State Routes 17, 105 and 235. It is bordered by Searsmont on the north, Lincolnville on the east, Camden and Rockport on the southeast, Union on the west and Appleton on the northwest.

Demographics

2010 census

As of the census of 2010, there were 1,536 people, 603 households, and 444 families residing in the town. The racial makeup of the town was 96.8% White, 0.1% African American, 0.8% Native American, 0.7% Asian, 0.1% from other races, and 1.6% from two or more races. Hispanic or Latino of any race were 1.0% of the population.

There were 603 households, of which 34.3% had children under the age of 18 living with them, 61.0% were married couples living together, 9.6% had a female householder with no husband present, 3.0% had a male householder with no wife present, and 26.4% were non-families. 18.6% of all households were made up of individuals, and 5.3% had someone living alone who was 65 years of age or older. The average household size was 2.54 and the average family size was 2.91.

The median age in the town was 43.2 years. 23.8% of residents were under the age of 18; 5.1% were between the ages of 18 and 24; 24.2% were from 25 to 44; 34% were from 45 to 64; and 12.9% were 65 years of age or older. The gender makeup of the town was 48.9% male and 51.1% female.

2000 census

As of the census of 2000, there were 1,310 people, 513 households, and 380 families residing in the town. The racial makeup of the town was 98.63% White, 0.15% African American, 0.31% Native American, 0.23% Asian, 0.15% from other races, and 0.53% from two or more races. Hispanic or Latino of any race were 0.84% of the population.

There were 513 households, out of which 35.5% had children under the age of 18 living with them, 62.8% were married couples living together, 7.8% had a female householder with no husband present, and 25.9% were non-families. 21.1% of all households were made up of individuals, and 6.2% had someone living alone who was 65 years of age or older.  The average household size was 2.54 and the average family size was 2.94.

In the town, the population was spread out, with 26.9% under the age of 18, 4.2% from 18 to 24, 32.8% from 25 to 44, 27.1% from 45 to 64, and 9.0% who were 65 years of age or older.  The median age was 38 years. For every 100 females, there were 97.3 males.  For every 100 females age 18 and over, there were 91.2 males.

The median income for a household in the town was $42,273, and the median income for a family was $45,781. Males had a median income of $33,125 versus $26,850 for females. The per capita income for the town was $24,385.  About 4.7% of families and 6.5% of the population were below the poverty line, including 6.6% of those under age 18 and 8.4% of those age 65 or over.

Education

For grades Kindergarten to 8, Hope is part of School Union 69.  Danielle Fagonde is the principal and Kate Clark is the superintendent. Hope Elementary School was one of two schools in the state of Maine to receive the title of National Blue Ribbon School in 2012.

For grades 9 to grades 12, Hope is part of the Five Town Community School District, which operates Camden Hills Regional High School. Maria Libby is the Superintendent.

References

Further reading

External links

 Town of Hope, Knox County, Maine
 Maine Genealogy: Hope, Knox County, Maine

Towns in Knox County, Maine
Towns in Maine